Marine engineering is the engineering of boats, ships, submarines, and any other marine vessel. Here it is also taken to include the engineering of other ocean systems and structures – referred to in certain academic and professional circles as “ocean engineering.”

Marine engineering applies a number of engineering sciences, including mechanical engineering, electrical engineering, electronic engineering, and computer science, to the development, design, operation and maintenance of watercraft propulsion and ocean systems. It includes but is not limited to power and propulsion plants, machinery, piping, automation and control systems for marine vehicles of any kind, as well as coastal and offshore structures.

History
Archimedes is traditionally regarded as the first marine engineer, having developed a number of marine engineering systems in antiquity. Modern marine engineering dates back to the beginning of the Industrial Revolution (early 1700s).

In 1712, Thomas Newcomen, a blacksmith, created a steam powered engine to pump water out of mines. In 1807, Robert Fulton successfully used a steam engine to propel a vessel through the water. Fulton's ship used the engine to power a small wooden paddle wheel as its marine propulsion system. The integration of a steam engine into a watercraft to create a marine steam engine was the start of the marine engineering profession. Only twelve years after Fulton’s Clermont had her first voyage, the Savannah marked the first sea voyage from America to Europe. Around 50 years later the steam powered paddle wheels had a peak with the creation of the Great Eastern, which was as big as one of the cargo ships of today, 700 feet in length, weighing 22,000 tons. Paddle steamers would become the front runners of the steamship industry for the next thirty years till the next type of propulsion came around.

Relevance and Scope
For nearly every person on Earth, the ocean is deeply intertwined with everyday life. Covering more than three quarters of the earth's surface, the ocean is traversed by approximately 80 percent of global commerce by volume and 70 percent by value. In the way of digital communications, transoceanic cables carry 99 percent of digital signal traffic internationally. Additionally, 40 percent of the world's population lives within 100 km of the coastline. From an environmental standpoint, the ocean contains the vast majority of Earth’s living species and biomass, provides much of its food (even to those living on land), and helps to regulate global climate. These things make the ocean an integral part of everyday life; with this in mind, marine engineering aims to discover new methods of harnessing the ocean for the benefit of humanity.

Despite humans’ close relationship with the ocean, much remains unknown about the ocean itself. It is estimated that 80 percent of the ocean floor remains unexplored, and more than 90 percent of ocean species remain undiscovered by science. Furthermore, performing engineering projects the ocean presents many unique challenges - such as saltwater corrosion, hydrodynamic and hydromechanical forces, remoteness of project locations, and extreme temperatures - that engineers must overcome in successfully designing ocean systems.

Related Fields

Naval architecture

In the engineering of seagoing vessels, naval architecture is concerned with the overall design of the ship and its propulsion through the water, while marine engineering ensures that the ship systems function as per the design. Although they have distinctive disciplines, naval architects and marine engineers often work side-by-side.

Ocean engineering (and combination with Marine engineering)

Ocean engineering is concerned with other structures and systems in or adjacent to the ocean, including offshore platforms, coastal structures such as piers and harbors, and other ocean systems such as ocean wave energy conversion and underwater life-support systems. This in fact makes ocean engineering a distinctive field from marine engineering, which is concerned with the design and application of shipboard systems specifically. However, on account of its similar nomenclature and multiple overlapping core disciplines (e.g. hydrodynamics, hydromechanics, and materials science), “ocean engineering” sometimes operates under the umbrella term of “marine engineering,” especially in industry and academia outside of the U.S. The same combination has been applied to the rest of this article.

Oceanography

Oceanography is a scientific field concerned with the acquisition and analysis of data to characterize the ocean. Although separate disciplines, marine engineering and oceanography are closely intertwined: marine engineers often use data gathered by oceanographers to inform their design and research, and oceanographers use tools designed by marine engineers (more specifically, oceanographic engineers) to advance their understanding and exploration of the ocean.

Mechanical engineering

Marine engineering incorporates many aspects of mechanical engineering. One manifestation of this relationship lies in the design of shipboard propulsion systems. Mechanical engineers design the main propulsion plant, the powering and mechanization aspects of the ship functions such as steering, anchoring, cargo handling, heating, ventilation, air conditioning interior and exterior communication, and other related requirements. Electrical power generation and electrical power distribution systems are typically designed by their suppliers; the only design responsibility of the marine engineering is installation.

Furthermore, an understanding of mechanical engineering topics such as fluid dynamics, fluid mechanics, linear wave theory, strength of materials, structural mechanics, and structural dynamics is essential to a marine engineer's repertoire of skills. These and other mechanical engineering subjects serve as an integral component of the marine engineering curriculum.

Civil Engineering
Civil engineering concepts play in an important role in many marine engineering projects such as the design and construction of ocean structures, ocean bridges and tunnels, and port/harbor design.

Electronics and Robotics
Marine engineering often deals in the fields of electrical engineering and robotics, especially in applications related to employing deep-sea cables and UUVs.

Deep-sea cables
A series of transoceanic fiber optic cables are responsible for connecting much of the world’s communication via the internet, carrying as much as 99 percent of total global internet and signal traffic. These cables must be engineered to withstand deep-sea environments that are remote and often unforgiving, with extreme pressures and temperatures as well as potential interference by fishing, trawling, and sea life.

UUV autonomy and networks
The use of unmanned underwater vehicles (UUVs) stands to benefit from the use of autonomous algorithms and networking. Marine engineers aim to learn how advancements in autonomy and networking can be used to enhance existing UUV technologies and facilitate the development of more capable underwater vehicles.

Petroleum Engineering
A knowledge of marine engineering proves useful in the field of petroleum engineering, as hydrodynamics and seabed integration serve as key elements in the design and maintenance of offshore oil platforms.

Challenges specific to marine engineering

Hydrodynamic loading
In the same way that civil engineers design to accommodate wind loads on building and bridges, marine engineers design to accommodate a ship or submarine struck by waves millions of times over the course of the vessel's life.

Stability
Any seagoing vessel has the constant need for hydrostatic stability. A naval architect, like an airplane designer, is concerned with stability. What makes the naval architect’s job unique is that a ship operates in two fluids simultaneously: water and air. Even after a ship has been designed and put to sea, marine engineers face the challenge of balancing cargo, as stacking containers vertically increases the mass of the ship and shifts the center of gravity higher. The weight of fuel also presents a problem, as the pitch of the ship may cause the liquid to shift, resulting in an imbalance. In some vessels, this offset will be counteracted by storing water inside larger ballast tanks. Marine engineers are responsible for the task of balancing and tracking the fuel and ballast water of a ship.

Corrosion
The saltwater environment faced by seagoing vessels makes them highly susceptible to corrosion. In every project, marine engineers are concerned with surface protection and preventing galvanic corrosion. Corrosion can be inhibited through cathodic protection by introducing pieces of metal (e.g. zinc) to serve as a “sacrificial anode” in the corrosion reaction. This causes the metal to corrode instead of the ship’s hull. Another way to prevent corrosion is by sending a controlled amount of low DC current through the ship’s hull, thereby changing the hull’s electrical charge and delaying the onset of electro-chemical corrosion.

Anti-fouling
Anti-fouling is the process of eliminating obstructive organisms from essential components of seawater systems. Depending on the nature and location of marine growth, this process is performed in a number of different ways:
Marine organisms may grow and attach to the surfaces of the outboard suction inlets used to obtain water for cooling systems. Electro-chlorination involves running high electrical current through sea water, altering the water’s chemical composition to create sodium hypochlorite, purging any bio-matter.
An electrolytic method of anti-fouling involves running electrical current through two anodes (Scardino, 2009). These anodes typically consist of copper and aluminum (or alternatively, iron). The first metal, copper anode, releases its ion into the water, creating an environment that is too toxic for bio-matter. The second metal, aluminum, coats the inside of the pipes to prevent corrosion. 
Other forms of marine growth such as mussels and algae may attach themselves to the bottom of a ship's hull. This growth interferes with the smoothness and uniformity of the ship’s hull, causing the ship to have a less hydrodynamic shape that causes it to be slower and less fuel-efficient. Marine growth on the hull can be remedied by using special paint that prevents the growth of such organisms.

Pollution control

Sulfur emission

The burning of marine fuels releases harmful pollutants into the atmosphere. Ships burn marine diesel in addition to heavy fuel oil. Heavy fuel oil, being the heaviest of refined oils, releases sulfur dioxide when burned. Sulfur dioxide emissions have the potential to raise atmospheric and ocean acidity causing harm to marine life. However, heavy fuel oil may only be burned in international waters due to the pollution created. It is commercially advantageous due to the cost effectiveness compared to other marine fuels. It is prospected that heavy fuel oil will be phased out of commercial use by the year 2020 (Smith, 2018).

Oil and water discharge

Water, oil, and other substances collect at the bottom of the ship in what is known as the bilge. Bilge water is pumped overboard, but must pass a pollution threshold test of 15 ppm (parts per million) of oil to be discharged. Water is tested and either discharged if clean or recirculated to a holding tank to be separated before being tested again. The tank it is sent back to, the oily water separator, utilizes gravity to separate the fluids due to their viscosity. Ships over 400 gross tons are required to carry the equipment to separate oil from bilge water. Further, as enforced by MARPOL, all ships over 400 gross tons and all oil tankers over 150 gross tons are required to log all oil transfers in an oil record book (EPA, 2011).

Cavitation
Cavitation is the process of forming an air bubble in a liquid due to the vaporization of that liquid cause by an area of low pressure. This area of low pressure lowers the boiling point of a liquid allowing it to vaporize into a gas. Cavitation can take place in pumps, which can cause damage to the impeller that moves the fluids through the system. Cavitation is also seen in propulsion. Low pressure pockets form on the surface of the propeller blades as its revolutions per minute increase (IIMS, 2015). Cavitation on the propeller causes a small but violent implosion which could warp the propeller blade. To remedy the issue, more blades allow the same amount of propulsion force but at a lower rate of revolutions. This is crucial for submarines as the propeller needs to keep the vessel relatively quiet to stay hidden. With more propeller blades, the vessel is able to achieve the same amount of propulsion force at lower shaft revolutions.

Applications
The following categories provide a number of focus areas in which marine engineers direct their efforts.

Arctic Engineering
In designing systems that operate in the arctic (especially scientific equipment such as meteorological instrumentation and oceanographic buoys), marine engineers must overcome an array of design challenges. Equipment must be able to operate at extreme temperatures for prolonged periods of time, often with little to no maintenance. This creates the need for exceptionally temperature-resistant materials and durable precision electronic components.

Coastal Design and Restoration
Coastal engineering applies a mixture of civil engineering and other disciplines to create coastal solutions for areas along or near the ocean. In protecting coastlines from wave forces, erosion, and sea level rise, marine engineers must consider whether they will use a “gray" infrastructure solution - such as a breakwater, culvert, or sea wall made from rocks and concrete - or a “green” infrastructure solution that incorporates aquatic plants, mangroves, and/or marsh ecosystems. It has been found that gray infrastructure costs more to build and maintain, but it may provide better protection against ocean forces in high-energy wave environments. A green solution is generally less expensive and more well-integrated with local vegetation, but may be susceptible to erosion or damage if executed improperly. In many cases engineers will select a hybrid approach that combines elements of both gray and green solutions.

Deep Sea Systems

Life Support
The design of underwater life support systems such as underwater hyperbaric dive chambers presents a unique set of challenges requiring a detailed knowledge of pressure vessels, dive physiology, and thermodynamics. Among the more recent developments in underwater life-support systems is an ocean space habitat designed by Winslow Burleson and Michael Lombardi. The prototype resembles an underwater tent and is said to satisfy full life-support functions for divers.

Unmanned Underwater Vehicles
Marine engineers may design or make frequent use of unmanned underwater vehicles, which operate underwater without a human aboard. UUVs often perform work in locations which would be otherwise impossible or difficult to access by humans due to a number of environmental factors (e.g. depth, remoteness, and/or temperature). UUVs can be remotely operated by humans, semi-autonomous, or autonomous.

Sensors and instrumentation
The development of oceanographic sciences, subsea engineering and the ability to detect, track and destroy submarines (anti-submarine warfare) required the parallel development of a host of marine scientific instrumentation and sensors. Visible light is not transferred far underwater, so the medium for transmission of data is primarily acoustic. High-frequency sound is used to measure the depth of the ocean, determine the nature of the seafloor, and detect submerged objects. The higher the frequency, the higher the definition of the data that is returned. Sound Navigation and Ranging or SONAR was developed during the First World War to detect submarines, and has been greatly refined through to the present day. Submarines similarly use sonar equipment to detect and target other submarines and surface ships, and to detect submerged obstacles such as seamounts that pose a navigational obstacle. Simple echo-sounders point straight down and can give an accurate reading of ocean depth (or look up at the underside of sea-ice).
More advanced echo sounders use a fan-shaped beam or sound, or multiple beams to derive highly detailed images of the ocean floor. High power systems can penetrate the soil and seabed rocks to give information about the geology of the seafloor, and are widely used in geophysics for the discovery of hydrocarbons, or for engineering survey. 
For close-range underwater communications, optical transmission is possible, mainly using blue lasers. These have a high bandwidth compared with acoustic systems, but the range is usually only a few tens of metres, and ideally at night. 
As well as acoustic communications and navigation, sensors have been developed to measure ocean parameters such as temperature, salinity, oxygen levels and other properties including nitrate levels, levels of trace chemicals and environmental DNA. The industry trend has been towards smaller, more accurate and more affordable systems so that they can be purchased and used by university departments and small companies as well as large corporations, research organisations and governments. The sensors and instruments are fitted to autonomous and remotely-operated systems as well as ships, and are enabling these systems to take on tasks that hitherto required an expensive human-crewed platform.
Manufacture of marine sensors and instruments mainly takes place in Asia, Europe and North America. Products are advertised in specialist journals, and through Trade Shows such as Oceanology International and Ocean Business which help raise awareness of the products.

Environmental Engineering
In every coastal and offshore project, environmental sustainability is an important consideration for the preservation of ocean ecosystems and natural resources. Instances in which marine engineers benefit from knowledge of environmental engineering include creation of fisheries, clean-up of oil spills, and creation of coastal solutions.

Offshore Systems
A number of systems designed fully or in part by marine engineers are used offshore - far away from coastlines.

Offshore oil platforms
The design of offshore oil platforms involves a number of marine engineering challenges. Platforms must be able to withstand ocean currents, wave forces, and saltwater corrosion while remaining structurally integral and fully anchored into the seabed. Additionally, drilling components must be engineered to handle these same challenges with a high factor of safety to prevent oil leaks and spills from contaminating the ocean.

Offshore wind farms
Offshore wind farms encounter many similar marine engineering challenges to oil platforms. They provide a source of renewable energy with a higher yield than wind farms on land, while encountering less resistance from the general public (see NIMBY).

Ocean wave energy
Marine engineers continue to investigate the possibility of ocean wave energy as a viable source of power for distributed or grid applications. Many designs have been proposed and numerous prototypes have been built, but the problem of harnessing wave energy in a cost-effective manner remains largely unresolved.

Port and Harbor Design
An marine engineer may also deal with the planning, creation, expansion, and modification of port and harbor designs. Harbors can be natural or artificial and protect anchored ships from wind, waves, and currents. Ports can be defined as a city, town, or place where ships are moored, loaded, or unloaded. Ports typically reside within a harbor and are made up of one or more individual terminals that handle a particular cargo including passengers, bulk cargo, or containerized cargo. Marine engineers plan and design various types of marine terminals and structures found in ports, and they must understand the loads imposed on these structures over the course of their lifetime.

Salvage and Recovery
Underwater salvage and recovery techniques are continuously modified and improved to find and recover shipwrecks and other valuable articles lost in the ocean. Marine engineers use their skills to assist at every stage of this process – from the planning of searches, to the documentation of wreck sites, to the physical recovery of entire vessels, artifacts, or parts thereof. Numerous famous examples of shipwrecks exist, but recoveries include Squalus (subsequently rechristened USS Sailfish (SS-192)) and Project Azorian, the clandestine recovery of a portion of Soviet submarine K-219 by the U.S. Navy and CIA in 1974 aboard Glomar Explorer.

Career

Industry
With a diverse engineering background, marine engineers work in a variety of industry jobs across every field of math, science, technology, and engineering. A few companies such as Oceaneering International and Van Oord specialize in marine engineering, while other companies consult marine engineers for specific projects. Such consulting commonly occurs in the oil industry, with companies such as Exxon Mobil and British Petroleum hiring marine engineers to manage aspects of their offshore drilling projects.

Military
Marine engineering lends itself to a number of military applications – mostly related to the Navy. The U.S. Navy’s Seabees, Civil Engineer Corps, and Engineering Duty Officers often perform work related to marine engineering. Military contractors (especially those in naval shipyards) and the Army Corps of Engineers play a role in certain marine engineering projects as well.

Expected Growth
In 2012, the average annual earnings for marine engineers in the U.S. were $96,140 with average hourly earnings of $46.22. As a field, marine engineering is predicted to grow approximately 12% from 2016 to 2026. Currently, there are about 8,200 naval architects and marine engineers employed, however, this number is expected to increase to 9,200 by 2026 (BLS, 2017). This is due at least in part to the critical role of the shipping industry on the global market supply chain; 80% of the world's trade by volume is done overseas by close to 50,000 ships, all of which require marine engineers aboard and shoreside (ICS, 2017). Additionally, offshore energy continues to grow, and a greater need exists for coastal solutions due to sea level rise.

Education

Maritime universities are dedicated to teaching and training students in maritime professions. Marine engineers generally have a bachelor's degree in marine engineering, marine engineering technology, or marine systems engineering. Practical training is valued by employers alongside the bachelor's degree.

Professional institutions
IMarEST
Society for Underwater Technology
IEEE Oceanic Engineering Society
Marine Engineering and Research Institute
Indian Maritime University
Royal Institution of Naval Architects (RINA)
Society of Naval Architects and Marine Engineers (SNAME) is a worldwide society that is focused on the advancement of the maritime industry. SNAME was founded in 1893.
American Society of Naval Engineers (ASNE)

Degrees in ocean engineering

A number of institutions - including MIT, UC Berkeley, the U.S. Naval Academy, and Texas A&M University - offer a four-year Bachelor of Science degree specifically in ocean engineering. Accredited programs consist of basic undergraduate math and science subjects such as calculus, statistics, chemistry, and physics; fundamental engineering subjects such as statics, dynamics, electrical engineering, and thermodynamics; and more specialized subjects such as ocean structural analysis, hydromechanics, and coastal management.

Graduate students in ocean engineering take classes on more advanced, in-depth subjects while conducting research to complete a graduate-level thesis. The Massachusetts Institute of Technology offers master’s and PhD degrees specifically in ocean engineering. Additionally, MIT co-hosts a joint program with the Woods Hole Oceanographic Institution for students studying ocean engineering and other ocean-related topics at the graduate level.

Journals and Conferences
Journals about ocean engineering include Ocean Engineering, the IEEE Journal of Oceanic Engineering and the Journal of Waterway, Port, Coastal, and Ocean Engineering.

Conferences in the field of marine engineering include the IEEE Oceanic Engineering Society’s OCEANS Conference and Exposition and the European Wave and Tidal Energy Conference (EWTEC).

Marine Engineering Achievements
The Delta Works is a series of 13 projects designed to protect the Netherlands against flooding from the North Sea. The American Society of Civil Engineers named it one of the “Seven Wonders of the Modern World.”
As of April 2021 twenty-two people have descended to Challenger Deep, the lowest point in the Earth’s ocean located in the Mariana Trench.
Recovery of Soviet submarine K-219 by a joint team of U.S. Navy and CIA engineers aboard Glomar Explorer.

Notable Marine Engineers

In Industry
Pieter van Oord, CEO of Royal van Oord

In Academia
Michael E. McCormick, Professor Emeritus of the Department of Naval Architecture and Ocean Engineering at the U.S. Naval Academy and pioneer of wave energy research

In Media and Popular Culture
Marine engineers performed an important role in the clean-up of oil spills such as Exxon Valdez and British Petroleum.
James Cameron’s documentary Deepsea Challenge follows the story of the team that built a submersible in which Cameron made the first solo descent to Challenger Deep, the lowest point in the Earth’s ocean.

See also

References

 
Engineering disciplines